D.o.A: The Third and Final Report is the second studio album by industrial music pioneers Throbbing Gristle, released in December 1978 by record label Industrial.

Release 
The first 1,000 records issued were enclosed with a card calendar with color photos of a little girl on a bed. Another pressing of 1,000 copies was recut with false track markers (the "bands" visible on a vinyl disc) to give it the appearance of having fifteen tracks of exactly equal length and a short 16th track.  The official TG discography called this pressing the "Structuralist Spirals" edition.  The single "United", which had garnered some popularity due to its relatively accessible style, was included on the album on fast forward, reducing its running time from 4:03 to 16 seconds. Later reissues of the Album omit the inset of the little girl and the card calendar due to it's visual closeness to child pornography by modern standards.

Critical reception 

Pitchfork described the album as "a nauseating masterpiece, and an essential recording". AllMusic stated that the album "is nearly as harsh and uncompromising as The Second Annual Report. While both albums are a mixture of live and studio material, D.o.A is much more stylistically varied -- rather than focusing on multiple versions of the same pieces (plus a 20-minute film score), each of the 13 tracks is distinct, ranging from captured conversations to thoroughly composed creations."

The album was included in the book 1001 Albums You Must Hear Before You Die. On the album, Throbbing Gristle member Chris Carter recalled: "DoA showcased some of our strongest work and established the course we would head in."

Track listing

Personnel 

 Genesis P-Orridge – vocals, bass guitar, violin, effects (track A6), production (tracks A1–A3, A5, B1, B4, B6 and B7)
 Cosey Fanni Tutti – lead guitar, effects, tape, production (tracks A1–A3, A5, B1, B4, B6 and B7)
 Chris Carter – synthesizer, electronics, tape, production (tracks A1–A3, A5, B1, B4, B6 and B7)
 Peter Christopherson – tape, electronics, production (tracks A1–A4, A5, B1, B4, B6 and B7)

 Additional personnel

 Robin Banks – voice (track B5)
 Simone Estridge – voice (track B5)

References

External links 

 

Throbbing Gristle albums
1978 albums
Albums with cover art by Hipgnosis